Daniel B. Cathcart (December 8, 1906 – January 23, 1959) was an American art director. He was nominated for two Academy Awards in the category Best Art Direction. He was born in Idaho and died in Los Angeles, California.

Selected filmography
Cathcart was nominated for two Academy Awards for Best Art Direction:
 Thousands Cheer (1943)
 Kismet (1944)

References

External links

1906 births
1959 deaths
American art directors
Artists from Idaho